The 2020 United States House of Representatives elections in New Mexico was held on November 3, 2020, to elect the three U.S. representatives from the state of New Mexico, one from each of the state's three congressional districts. The elections coincided with the 2020 U.S. presidential election, as well as other elections to the House of Representatives, elections to the United States Senate and various state and local elections.

As a result of Herrell and Leger Fernandez's wins, the election resulted in all three members of New Mexico's house delegation being women of color, the second US state (after Hawaii) to do so.  New Mexico is also the first state to have a majority of its house representatives be Native Americans. However, a few months later, Deb Haaland was appointed Secretary of the Interior, resulting in a special election held on June 1, 2021. As a result of Haaland's resignation and the special election, New Mexico ceased to have an all-women of color and majority Native American House delegation.

Overview

Results of the 2020 United States House of Representatives elections in New Mexico by district:

District 1

The 1st district is centered around Albuquerque, taking in most of Bernalillo County, Torrance County, and parts of Sandoval County, Santa Fe County and Valencia County. The incumbent was Democrat Deb Haaland, who was elected with 59.1% of the vote in 2018.

Democratic primary

Candidates

Nominee
Deb Haaland, incumbent U.S. Representative

Results

Republican primary

Candidates

Nominee
 Michelle Garcia Holmes, retired police detective and nominee for Lieutenant Governor of New Mexico in 2018

Eliminated in primary
Brett Kokinadis, founder of New Mexico Democrats for Democracy
Jared Vanderdussen, attorney

Results

General election

Predictions

Endorsements

Polling

Results

District 2

The 2nd district covers southern New Mexico, including Las Cruces, Roswell, and the southern part of Albuquerque. The incumbent was Democrat Xochitl Torres Small, who flipped the district and was elected with 50.9% of the vote in 2018.

Democratic primary

Candidates

Nominee
Xochitl Torres Small, incumbent U.S. Representative

Results

Republican primary

Candidates

Nominee 
 Yvette Herrell, former state representative and nominee for New Mexico's 2nd congressional district in 2018

Eliminated in primary
Claire Chase, oil company executive
Chris Mathys, businessman, candidate for New Mexico Public Regulation Commission in 2018, and former Fresno city councilman

Declined
Leland Gould, lobbyist
Monty Newman, businessman, former chair of the New Mexico Republican Party, former mayor of Hobbs, and candidate for New Mexico's 2nd congressional district in 2018
Steve Pearce, chair of the New Mexico Republican Party, former U.S. Representative, and nominee for Governor of New Mexico in 2018

Polling

Results

General election

Predictions

Endorsements

Polling

Results

District 3

The 3rd district encompasses all of northern New Mexico, including the city of Santa Fe, and includes most of the Navajo Nation and Puebloans within New Mexico. The incumbent was Democrat Ben Ray Luján, who was re-elected with 63.4% of the vote in 2018, and announced on April 1, 2019 that he would seek the Democratic nomination for U.S. Senate in 2020. Luján won the primary, and ultimately the general election.

Democratic primary

Candidates

Nominee 
 Teresa Leger Fernandez, attorney and daughter of former state senator Ray Leger

Eliminated in primary
John Blair, former New Mexico Deputy Secretary of State and former political aide to U.S. Senator Martin Heinrich
Laura Montoya, Sandoval County treasurer
Valerie Plame, former CIA operations officer
Joseph L. Sanchez, state representative
Marco Serna, Santa Fe County District Attorney
Kyle Tisdel, environmental attorney

Withdrawn
Robert Apodaca, businessman and former United States Department of Agriculture regional official
Mark McDonald, chair of the Colfax County Democratic Party (endorsed Serna)

Declined
Hector Balderas, Attorney General of New Mexico
Brian Egolf, speaker of the New Mexico House of Representatives
Valerie Espinoza, New Mexico Public Regulation Commissioner for the 3rd district and former Santa Fe County clerk
Paula Garcia, executive director of the New Mexico Acequia Association
Stephanie Garcia Richard, New Mexico Commissioner of Public Lands
Ben Ray Luján, incumbent U.S. Representative (running for U.S. Senate)
Joseph Maestas, mayor of Española and former Santa Fe city councilman
Andrea Romero, state representative
John Sapien, state senator
Victor Snover, mayor of Aztec
Carl Trujillo, former state representative
Linda Trujillo, state representative
JoAnne Vigil Coppler, Santa Fe city councilwoman
Renee Villarreal, Santa Fe city councilwoman
Alan Webber, mayor of Santa Fe
Peter Wirth, majority leader of the New Mexico Senate

Endorsements

Polling

Pre-primary convention results 
Candidates for the Democratic nomination needed to either receive the votes of 20% of the delegates at the pre-primary convention on March 7, or collect and submit signatures to the secretary of state to have made it to the June 2 primary.

Results

Republican primary

Candidates

Nominee 
 Alexis Johnson, environmental engineer and rancher

Eliminated in primary
Karen Bedonie, member of the Navajo Nation and small business owner
Harry Montoya, former Santa Fe County commissioner

Disqualified
Audra Lee Brown, businesswoman
Anastacia Golden Morper, real estate agent

Withdrawn
Brett Kokinadis, founder of New Mexico Democrats for Democracy

Declined
Jefferson Byrd, New Mexico Public Regulation Commissioner for the 2nd district and nominee for New Mexico's 3rd congressional district in 2014
Gregg Hull, mayor of Rio Rancho
Patrick H. Lyons, former New Mexico Public Regulation Commissioner for the 2nd district, former New Mexico Commissioner of Public Lands, and former state senator
Thomas Mullins, businessman and nominee for New Mexico's 3rd congressional district in 2010

Results

Libertarian primary

Candidates

Nominee
Michael Lucero, rancher and nominee for New Mexico Commissioner of Public Lands in 2018

Green primary

Candidates

Declined
Carol Miller, activist and nominee for New Mexico's 3rd congressional district in 1997, 1998, and 2008

General election

Predictions

Polling

Results

See also
 2020 New Mexico elections

Notes

Partisan clients

References

External links
 
 
  (State affiliate of the U.S. League of Women Voters)
 

Official campaign websites for 1st district candidates
 Michelle Garcia Holmes (R) for Congress
 Deb Haaland (D) for Congress

Official campaign websites for 2nd district candidates
 Yvette Herrell (R) for Congress
 Xochitl Torres Small (D) for Congress

Official campaign websites for 3rd district candidates
 Alexis Johnson (R) for Congress
 Teresa Leger Fernandez (D) for Congress
 Michael Lucero (L) for Congress

2020
New Mexico
United States House of Representatives